The Management and Science Institute (MSI) which is located in Colombo, Sri Lanka is a fully affiliated with the Management and Science University, Malaysia and have partnership with other universities, including University of Newcastle (Australia), Josai University, Coventry University.

It issues diplomas in Accounting, Bio Medical Science, Business Management, Event Management, Game Design, Hospitality & Tourism Management and Human Capital Management.

Cultural Activity
Management and Science Institute (MSI) offered a degree Hospitality & Tourism Management and Under this Segment Every year they are arranging a Youth Leadership Camp Called Global Young Leadership Peace Camp. A lot of participant around the world participate in this program. Management and Science Institute (MSI) and Management and Science University (MSU) Jointly arrange this program.

See more
Management and Science University

References

Universities and colleges in Colombo